Ragwŏn Station may refer to:
 Ragwŏn Station (P'yŏngyang), Hyŏksin Line, P'yŏngyang Metro in Taesŏng-guyŏk, P'yŏngyang
 Ragwŏn Station (P'yŏngŭi Line) in Ragwŏn 1-dong, Sinŭiju, North P'yŏngan Province
 Ragwŏn Station (P'yŏngra Line) in Ragwŏn County, South Hamgyŏng Province